The  is a prefectural museum located in Tottori, Japan, dedicated to the nature, history, folklore, and art of Tottori Prefecture. Over three thousand items from the permanent collection are on display and the museum also stages temporary exhibitions.

See also

 Tottori City Historical Museum
 Inaba Province
 Hōki Province

References

External links
 Tottori Prefectural Museum
 Tottori Prefectural Museum at Google Cultural Institute

History museums in Japan
Museums in Tottori Prefecture
Tottori (city)
Prefectural museums
Museums established in 1972
1972 establishments in Japan